is a private women's junior college in Kurume, Fukuoka, Japan, established in 1968. In 2004 the college was selected for Good Practice, a fund program by the ministry of education.

External links
 Official website

Japanese junior colleges
Educational institutions established in 1968
Private universities and colleges in Japan
Universities and colleges in Fukuoka Prefecture